Victoria - Ek Rahasya is a 2023 Indian Marathi-language Horror-thriller film directed by Virajas Kulkarni and Jeet Ashok. It's producers Anand Pandit, Roopa Pandit and Pushkar Jog. The film stars Pushkar Jog, Sonalee Kulkarni, Akshay Kulkarni in lead roles. Victoria Ek Rahasya was theatrically released on 13 January 2023.

Premise 

When Ankita and Siddharth arrive at Hotel Victoria in the centre of Scotland, they quickly know that the creepy owner Adhiraj has some secrets he's trying to hide, and Ankita can't help but sense another sinister presence inside the old hotel.  Is there a sense of vengeance swirling around the hotel grounds, or is it all in their mind?  It's a race against time as the mystery is unraveled and nothing is as it seems.

Cast 
 Pushkar Jog as Adhiraj
 Sonalee Kulkarni as Ankita
 Aashay Kulkarni as Siddhartha
 Heera Sohal
 Mikaila Telford

Release 
The film was initially slated to hit the theaters on 16 December but due to the release of Avatar: The Way of Water on the same day, Victoria Ek Rahasya extended its release date and was released in theaters on 13 January 2023.

Soundtrack

References

External links 
 

2023 films
2020s Marathi-language films
2023 horror films
Indian horror films
Indian thriller films